L'Europe buissonnière is a 1949 novel by the French writer Antoine Blondin. It is based on Blondin's experiences as an STO worker at a rubber plant in Austria in 1943 and 1944. It depicts Europe during World War II in a comical fashion reminiscent of Louis-Ferdinand Céline's Journey to the End of the Night.

It was Blondin's debut novel and received the Prix des Deux Magots.

References

1949 French novels
French-language novels
Novels by Antoine Blondin
Novels set in Austria
Novels set during World War II
Prix des Deux Magots winners
1949 debut novels